Hemangiomatosis may refer to:

 Diffuse neonatal hemangiomatosis
 Benign neonatal hemangiomatosis

Cutaneous congenital anomalies